Andrew Gorton (born 23 September 1966) is an English former professional football goalkeeper. He played in the Football League for Oldham Athletic, Stockport County, Tranmere Rovers, Lincoln City and Crewe Alexandra.

Gorton was born in Salford and joined Oldham Athletic as an apprentice. He progressed to their first team, eventually replacing Andy Goram when he left for Rangers. He had loan spells with Stockport County and Tranmere Rovers before leaving Oldham to join Stockport in 1988. At the end of the 1988–89 season he joined Lincoln City, but was transferred after 20 games, joining non-league Glossop North End for their club record fee paid of £3000 in 1989. He rejoined Oldham Athletic in 1990, again for a fee of £3000, but moved on to Crewe Alexandra on non-contract terms without appearing in the league for Oldham. He played three times for Crewe before joining Witton Albion. Gorton moved from Witton to Mossley playing four times during the 1991–92 season.

He later joined Bury, from where he was on loan to Altrincham in May 1993.

References

1966 births
Footballers from Salford
English footballers
Oldham Athletic A.F.C. players
Stockport County F.C. players
Tranmere Rovers F.C. players
Lincoln City F.C. players
Glossop North End A.F.C. players
Crewe Alexandra F.C. players
Witton Albion F.C. players
Mossley A.F.C. players
Bury F.C. players
Altrincham F.C. players
English Football League players
Living people
Association football goalkeepers